Jurga Šeduikytė (born February 11, 1980, Klaipėda, Lithuania), known by her stage names Jurga and formerly Dingau, is a Lithuanian singer and songwriter.

Biography

Jurga was born into a family of musicians in Telšiai, where she spent her first childhood years. In her second school year she moved to Palanga, where she took piano lessons at the local music school and graduated from high school. She studied journalism at Vilnius University.

In 2002, she participated in the TV singer contest Fizz Superstar. The same year she began to perform under the pseudonym Dingau with girl-rock band Muscat.  In 2004 she played in the musicals Ugnies medžioklė su varovais and Tadas Blinda.

In 2005, she began her solo career under the stage name Jurga. Her debut album, Aukso Pieva (Meadow of Gold), produced by Andrius Mamontovas, was released on September 16, 2005. The first single,  Nebijok (Don't Be Afraid) charted at number one for eight weeks and became the biggest hit single in Lithuania of 2005.

The debut album includes twelve songs in Lithuanian and English, almost all of them written by Jurga herself. Shortly after this, Jurga received many Lithuanian awards.

Jurga's second album, Instrukcija (Instruction) was released on April 19, 2007. It includes thirteen tracks written by Jurga in Lithuania and New Zealand.  The album release was accompanied by a tour across Lithuania and a visit to Anaberg Castle, Friesdorf district of Bonn, Germany.

In July 2007, her song, "5th Season", won the Grand Prix of the Baltic Song Festival in Karlshamn, Sweden. A few months later, on November 1, Jurga won the MTV European Music Award for Best Baltic Act. Jurga was the first Lithuanian to win an MTV award.

On August 28, 2008, Jurga's son Adas was born. On August 26, 2009, she married her boyfriend and father of her son, Vidas Bareikis, vocalist of the band Suicide DJs.

Discography

Albums
Aukso pieva (2005)
 "Aukso pieva"
 "Aš esu tiktai jei tu esi" - l. Andrius Mamontovas
 "Nebijok"
 "Trouble"
 "Pilnatis" - l. Andrius Mamontovas
 "Laisvė" - m. Eurika Masytė, l. Justinas Marcinkevičius
 "Kai pamirši tu mane" - m., l. Andrius Mamontovas
 "The longest day"
 "Gėlių takai"
 "Galbūt"
 "Saulė vandeny"
 "Vakar lijo čia"

Instrukcija (2007)
 "Instrukcija"
 "Koralų pasaka"
 "Angelai"
 "Smėlio žmonės"
 "Spiderwoman: rising"
 "Juodos gulbės"
 "5th season"
 "Benamio daina"
 "Renkuosi Žemę"
 "Ryte"
 "Per silpna"
 "Šerlokas Holmsas"
 "Prie žalio vandens"

+37° (Goal of Science) (2009)
 "+37°"
 "Rykliai ir vilkolakiai"
 "Kišeniniai namai"
 "Tyliai"
 "Running"
 "Miego vagys"
 "Living like You Said"
 "Goal of Science"
 "Melsvai žalia"
 "Drugys"
 "The Night Is Waiting"
 "Soft Explosion"

Prie Žalio Vandens (2011)
Metronomes (2011) 
 "1000 Clowns"
 "Мне Уже Не Важно"
 Žvėriukai
 Hey, Sisters
 Tūla
 Nuskrido
 Kosmosas
 Ne Poetas
 Ilgu
 No One Can Move
 Я Слежу За Тобой
 Final

 Breaking The Line (2013) 
 Jūra Vandenynas
 Walking On The Pillows
 Hey, Joe
 Laiko Nėra
 Sky Is Closer Than You
 Om (Interlude)
 Om
 Dangau
 So Blue
 Breaking The Line
 The End

 Giliai Vandeny (2015) 
 Tavo Krante
 Juoduoju Baltuoju
 Giliai Vandeny
 Meilė,Muzika Ir Laikas
 Sapnas
 Ten, Kur Tu
 Pauštelis
 Kvepia Tavim Dangus
 Sapnų Mergina
 Liūlia Liūlia
 Ašara
 If
 Master And Tatyana

 Not Perfect (2017) 
 Not Perfect
 Bro
 King Of My Time
 Life Is A Dance For One
 If
 No Pain No Gain
 Dreaming
 Reikalingi
 Would You Take A Care Of Me
 Upių Slėniuose

Awards
 RadioCentras Awards:  Female Artist of The Year 2008
 MTV Europe Music Awards: Best Baltic Act, 2007
 Baltic Song festival Grand Prix (Karlshamn, Sweden):  Jurga 5th season, 2007
 Radiocentras Award 2007:  Female Artist of The Year
 Alfa Award:  Album of The Year - Instrukcija, 2007
 Sugihara Foundation Diplomats For Life Award:  Tolerance Award of The Year 2007
 Moteris Award:  Woman of The Year 2007
 Pravda 2007 Special Award:  Special Award for Representing The Truth
 Lithuanian www championship:  Best personal site - www.jurgamusic.com
 Baltic Optical Disc award:  For platinum album Aukso pieva, 2006
 Bravo 2005 Awards:  Debut of The Year, Album of The Year - Aukso Pieva 2005, Female Artist of The Year
 Radiocentras Awards 2005:  Female Artist of The Year, Song of The Year - Nebijok, 2005, Album of The Year - Aukso Pieva, 2005
 JP Music Awards 2005:  Female Artist of The Year, Song of The Year - Nebijok, 2005, Voice of Nation Award
 Ore Awards 2005:  Song of The Year - Nebijok, 2005, Debut of The Year
 Pravda Newcomer Awards 2005:  Lithuanian Song of The Year - Nebijok, 2005, Newcomer of The Year
 Lithuanian Radio Award:  The Most Popular Song of The Year - Nebijok, 2005

References

External links
Jurga in myspace.com
Jurga in discogs.com

1980 births
Living people
21st-century Lithuanian women singers
Lithuanian pop singers
People from Telšiai
MTV Europe Music Award winners